The 1997 Men's Hockey Junior World Cup was the sixth edition of the Hockey Junior World Cup, the quadrennial world championship for men's national under-21 national field hockey teams organized by the International Hockey Federation. It was held from 17 to 28 September 1997 in Milton Keynes, England.

Australia won the tournament for the first time by defeating India 3–2 in the final. Germany won the bronze medal by defeating England 4–2 in the third and fourth place playoff.

Qualification

Results
All times are Central European Summer Time (UTC+02:00)

Preliminary round

Pool A

Pool B

Ninth to twelfth place classification

Cross-overs

Eleventh and twelfth place

Ninth and tenth place

Fifth to eighth place classification

Cross-overs

Seventh and eighth place

Fifth and sixth place

First to fourth place classification

Semi-finals

Third and fourth place

Final

Statistics

Final standings

Goalscorers

References

Hockey Junior World Cup
Junior World Cup
International field hockey competitions hosted by England
Hockey Junior World Cup
Sport in Milton Keynes
Hockey Junior World Cup
Hockey World Cup
1990s in Buckinghamshire